Canton Bay may refer to:
 Kwangchow Bay, an alternative name for the former French colony of Kouang-Tchéou-Wan (present day Zhanjiang, Guangdong)
 The mouth of the Pearl River (China)

See also 
 Canton Beach, New South Wales
 Canton, Massachusetts